Philip Rauscher (born June 2, 1985) is an American football coach who is the offensive line coach for the Jacksonville Jaguars of the National Football League (NFL). He previously served as an assistant coach for the Minnesota Vikings, Washington Redskins and Denver Broncos.

Playing career
Rauscher was a lineman at UCLA from 2003 to 2005, before an injury suffered in high school reappeared and forced him to retire.

Coaching career

College coaching
Rauscher stayed with UCLA as an undergraduate assistant at the request of Bruins head coach Karl Dorrell and offensive coordinator Tom Cable. After graduating, he remained with the program as a graduate assistant before going on to Dixie State as their offensive coordinator in 2010. He was an administrative assistant at Utah in 2011 for Utes offensive coordinator Norm Chow, who was UCLA's offensive coordinator when Rauscher was a graduate assistant. 

After Chow was named the head coach at Hawaii in 2012, Rauscher was named the program's tight ends coach and recruiting coordinator. He was not retained by Chow and Hawaii after the 2013 season. Rauscher spent 2014 as the offensive coordinator and offensive line coach at Cal Lutheran.

Denver Broncos
Rauscher was hired as a coaching assistant for the Denver Broncos in 2015. He was a part of the staff that won Super Bowl 50 in 2016, Rauscher's first career Super Bowl ring. He was named the assistant to head coach Vance Joseph in 2017.

Washington Redskins
Rauscher was named the assistant offensive line coach for the Washington Redskins on March 20, 2018. He was promoted to offensive line coach during the 2019 season after offensive line coach Bill Callahan was named the Redskins interim head coach.

Minnesota Vikings
Rauscher was announced as the assistant offensive line coach for the Minnesota Vikings on January 27, 2020. He was promoted to offensive line coach on July 27, 2021 after Rick Dennison was reassigned to senior offensive adviser due to a lack of a Covid-19 vaccination.

Jacksonville Jaguars
On February 17, 2022, Rauscher was hired by the Jacksonville Jaguars as their offensive line coach under head coach Doug Pederson.

References

External links
Jacksonville Jaguars profile
 Minnesota Vikings profile

1985 births
Living people
American football defensive linemen
American football offensive linemen
Cal Lutheran Kingsmen football coaches
Coaches of American football from California
Denver Broncos coaches
Utah Tech Trailblazers football coaches
Hawaii Rainbow Warriors football coaches
Jacksonville Jaguars coaches
Minnesota Vikings coaches
Players of American football from California
Sportspeople from Carlsbad, California
UCLA Bruins football coaches
Utah Utes football coaches
Washington Redskins coaches